Rothesay is the principal town on the Isle of Bute, Scotland.

Rothesay or Rothsay may also refer to:

Places
Rothesay, New Brunswick, Canada
Rothesay (electoral district), Canada
Rothesay Parish, New Brunswick, Canada
Rothesay Bay, a suburb in Auckland, New Zealand
Rothesay (Parliament of Scotland constituency)
Rothsay (Forest, Virginia), United States
Rothsay, Minnesota, United States
Rothsay, Ontario, Canada
Rothsay, Richmond, Virginia, United States
Rothsay, Western Australia
Isle of Bute, Scotland, formerly called "Rothesay"

People
Duke of Rothesay

Schools
Rothesay Academy, a secondary school in Rothesay, Isle of Bute
Rothesay Netherwood School, in Rothesay, New Brunswick
Rothesay School, in Berkhamsted, England

Ships
HMS Rothesay, the name of two ships of the Royal Navy
Rothsay Castle (ship), a paddle steamer in the United Kingdom
Rothesay, a 1444-ton sailing ship made famous by female mariner Bessie Hall in 1870